George Blackburn may refer to:

George Blackburn (American football) (1913–2006), American football coach (Miami University, University of Cincinnati, University of Virginia)
George Blackburn (baseball) (1871–?), American baseball player (Baltimore Orioles)
George Blackburn (footballer, born 1888) (1888–?), English footballer (Bradford PA, Huddersfield Town)
George Blackburn (footballer, born 1899) (1899–1957), English footballer (Aston Villa, Cardiff City, England)
George L. Blackburn (died 2017), professor of nutrition at Harvard Medical School
George G. Blackburn (1917–2006), Canadian soldier and author